Nancy 9, also known as  Hassa Beek (English: I Feel You), is the ninth studio album by Lebanese singer Nancy Ajram. It was released on April 21, 2017, through In2Musica. Ajram began planning the album in 2014. Nancy 9 was made available for digital download on April 21 through iTunes. This album most notably features Nancy’s chart topping hit “Aam Bet’alla Feek”. 

As executive producers, Nancy and her manager, Jiji Lamara, enlisted previous collaborators Tarek Madkour, Walid Saad, Samir Sfeir, Mohammed Rifai, Ahmed Ibrahim and Hadi Sharara to work alongside new collaborators such as Khaled Tag Eldeen, Salim Assaf, Tamer Hussein and Hicham Boulos. After a middling album in 2014, Nancy 8, this new album was expected to be a great come back for the Lebanese singer. The album was released to positive reviews from music critics and numerous publications included it on their lists of the best albums of 2017.

Promotion and release 

On March 26, 2017, Ajram announced the album on her social media accounts, revealing the cover art and pre-order release date. Two days later, she posted the official teaser video previewing 10 second snippets of each track. On March 30, the album was listed for pre-order and the songs were to be available on April 21. The songs "El Hob Zay El Watar" and "Keefak Bel Hob" were released as promotional singles. The first was released digitally on March 31, then was sent to radio one day later. It debuted at number one on Anghami's Top Anghami chart. Billboards featuring the album cover filled the streets of Lebanese and Egyptian cities in early April. The album was digitally released worldwide on April 21, followed by physical CD release two days later in the Arab world.

Style and composition 

Nancy 9 is built around a Mediterranean and South American theme that incorporates pop styles with elements of dance-pop and pop rock. The title track "Hassa Beek" relies on Latin guitar and beat, composed by Egyptian musician Khaled Ezz, whom Ajram collaborates with for the first time. The following track "Helm El Banat" is a folk-pop song, which contains anthemic chorus and Lebanese dabka rhythm. "Khamsa Farfasha" reminds of Ajram's Egyptian pop hits "Ah W Noss" and "Ya Tabtab", just as "Keefak Bel Hob" does.

One of the rhythmic songs in the album, "Albi Biyes'al Einy", is full of violins in a disco way, characterized by its western dance style. "Kharab Byoot" returns Ajram to the Khaleeji folk sound she presented in "La Teloum", which was released in Ah W Noss album. "El Hob Zay El Watar", a romantic sensual style mixed with a Tarab spirit, composed by Egyptian well-known musician Walid Saad, whom Ajram constantly works with. "W Maak" is a house-disco track, in which Ajram presents a completely new genre of the Middle Eastern music.

Another fast-Egyptian track is "Zabbat W Khattat", written by Tamer Hussein, whom Ajram also works with for the first time. "Bel Sodfa" and "Mesh Enta" are deep emotional sad tracks, speaking about a heartbroken woman who finds out her lover is cheating. The other Gulf song in the album is "Ayi Hob W Ayi Gheera", characterized by its rhythmic melody, showing a new side of Ajram's vocal abilities. "Aam Betaala' Feek" was selected as the album's lead single and is a romantic song about the beginning of love feelings. The reggaeton beat in "Rooh Ya Shater", composed by Samir Sfeir and produced by Boudy Naoum, reminds of some best 2000's songs.

Singles 

The album's lead single, "Aam Betaala' Feek", was released on December 16, 2016, exclusively through Anghami, which broke a new record as the fastest song to reach one Million streams in the App history. The song also received commercial success, topping several Arabic music charts and radio stations for consecutive weeks. A lyric video of the song was released two weeks later, on January 1, 2017.

"Hassa Beek", the title track, was released as the second single on April 6. The song peaked at number one on Anghami's Top Anghami chart and other music charts in several Arab countries. The official music video, which premiered on the same day, was viewed 1 million times on YouTube in its first 24 hours. The theatrics come alive in "Hassa Beek"'s video, which sees Ajram play the radiant role of an old Hollywood movie star in the midst of a steamy love affair. The almost six-minute video was directed by Leila Kanaan, as a comeback after a 5-year absence.

"W Maak" was released on March 29, 2018, as the album's third official single. The song went to radio stations in the Middle East in April 2017, it peaked at number one on Agmad 7 chart on Nogoum FM seven months prior to its single release. The official music video, also directed by Leila Kanaan, premiered at the same day of the single release, featuring Ajram in an old-school American-style diner, dressed in a metallic baseball jacket and denim shorts and getting weirdly over-familiar with the venue's jukebox. Later on, the video received four international awards and recognition, it was selected at Clipped Music Video Festival'''s International Top 30 chart, nominated for "Best Music Video" at the International Music Video Underground Festival, won "Merit Special Mention" at the Accolade Global Film Competition and "Best Music Video" at Queen Palm International Festival.

"El Hob Zay El Watar" was originally released as a promotional single for the album on March 31, 2017. Its official release as the fourth single took place on February 12, 2019, the same date its music video was released, marking her third collaboration with director Leila Kanaan in the album.

 Commercial performance Nancy 9 debuted at number one on the HitMarker'''s Best-Selling Albums Chart and remained atop for 16 continuous weeks since its release. The record topped Virgin Megastores sales in Lebanon for 4 continuous months, while in Egypt it remained atop for 15 continuous weeks, as well as in KSA, UAE and Bahrain for continuous weeks.

Track listing 
The track list was announced via iTunes on March 30, 2017.

Personnel 

Adapted from the album liner notes.

 Ahmed Ragab – bass (tracks 1,3)
 Mostafa Aslan – guitar (tracks 1,3,4,5,10)
 Ehab Farouk – percussion (track 1)
 Yehia EL Mougy – studio choir conducting (tracks 1,4)
 Yehia Zakaria –  executive production (tracks 1,3,4)
 Tarek Madkour – producer; mixing; (tracks 1,3,4)
 Elie Barbar – mastering mixing (tracks 2,5,7,8,9,13)
 Farouk Mohammed Hasan – accordion (track 3)
 Reda Bedair – ney (track 3)
 Maged Souror – qanun (tracks 3,10)
 Hisham El Arabi – riq (track 3)
 Ahmed Ayadi – tabla (track 3)
 Mohammed Sakr – mixing (tracks 6,10)
 Ahmed Ibrahim – producer; strings writing (track 6); mixing (track 11); piano (track 11)
 Tamer Ghonim – strings conducting (track 6)
 Wael El Naggar – accordion (track 10)
 Said Kamal – violin (track 11)
 Sherif Fahmy – guitar (track 11)
 Hussam Kamil – producer; mixing (track 12)
 Khaled Abu Munther – general supervision (track 12)
 Boudy Naoum – producer; mixing (track 14)
 Mohamad Seifeedine AKA mSeif – photography
 Jad Aoun – graphic design
 Caroline Cassia Mokbel – styling
 Fady Kataya – make-up
 Mohamad Edelbi – hair dressing
 Elie Saab – dressing

Release history

Awards and nominations 

 
|-
|rowspan="3"| 2017 || Nancy Ajram || Most Streamed Artist || 
|-
| Aam Betaala' Feek || Most Streamed Song || 
|-
| Nancy 9 || Most Streamed Album || 
|-

|-
|rowspan="3"| 2018 || Nancy Ajram || Best Female Lebanese Singer || 
|-
|rowspan="2"| Nancy 9 || Best Album || 
|-
| Best Music Video || 
|-

|-
|rowspan="6"| 2018 || Nancy Ajram || Best Arabic Female Singer of 2017 || 
|-
|rowspan="3"| Aam Betaala' Feek || Best Levant Song of 2017 || 
|-
| Most Streamed and Downloaded Song of 2017 || 
|-
| Song of the Year 2017 || 
|-
|rowspan="2"| Nancy 9 || Best Levant Song of 2017 || 
|-
| Best album of 2017 || 
|-

References 

Nancy Ajram albums
2017 albums
Arabic-language albums